The Negro River is a river of Jamaica. This river is located on the south coast of Jamaica in a Parish called St. Thomas. Going downstream it eventually connects to the YaIlahs River.

See also
List of rivers of Jamaica

References
 GEOnet Names Server
OMC Map
CIA Map
Ford, Jos C. and Finlay, A.A.C. (1908).The Handbook of Jamaica. Jamaica Government Printing Office

Rivers of Jamaica